Events during the year 1964 in Northern Ireland.

Incumbents
 Governor - 	The Lord Wakehurst (until 1 December), The Lord Erskine of Rerrick (from 1 December) 
 Prime Minister - Terence O'Neill

Events
28 January - Families from Springtown Camp make a silent march through Derry to demand rehousing.
28 September - Following threats of direct action by Ian Paisley, the Royal Ulster Constabulary remove an Irish tricolour displayed in the office window of Independent Republican election candidate Billy McMillen in West Belfast. Several days of rioting ensue.
15 October - 1964 United Kingdom general election.
New bridge over the River Foyle, linking Lifford and Strabane is built.

Arts and literature
17 April - The band Them, fronted by Van Morrison, play their first gig at his rhythm and blues Club Rado at the Maritime Hotel, Belfast.
Synagogue for Belfast Hebrew Congregation designed by Eugene Rosenberg of Yorke, Rosenberg and Mardall.
Extension to the Ulster Museum, Belfast, designed in Brutalist style by Francis Pym, completed.

Sport

Football
Irish League
Winners: Glentoran

Irish Cup
Winners: Derry City 2 - 0 Glentoran

Armagh City F.C. founded as Milford Everton.

Olympics
Robin Dixon, 3rd Baron Glentoran wins the Gold medal for the two-man bobsleigh with Tony Nash at the 1964 Winter Olympics at Innsbruck.

Births
18 January - Richard Dunwoody, jockey.
24 February - Robert McLiam Wilson, novelist.
26 March - Martin Donnelly, motor racing driver.
29 August - Dara O'Hagan, Sinn Féin MLA and councillor.
15 September - Alan Jones, architect.
1 November - Terry Magee, boxer.
8 December - Charles McCrum, cricketer.
26 December - Ian Wilson, composer.
Full date unknown - John Long, painter.

Deaths

See also
1964 in Scotland
1964 in Wales

References

 
Northern Ireland